Pavel Vasilievich Sulyandziga ( born 20 February 1962 in Olon, Pozharsky District, Primorsky Kray) is a Russian indigenous rights activist of Udege nationality. He is a  member of  the UN Working Group on the issue of human rights and transnational corporations and other business enterprises, tasked with the dissemination of the UN Guiding Principles on Business and Human Rights and a former member of the Public Chamber of Russia

Until 2010, he was the first vice-president of the Russian Association of Indigenous Peoples of the North (RAIPON) and member of the United Nations Permanent Forum on Indigenous Issues

Sulyandziga's home region is the Bikin River valley, located in close proximity to the Sikhote-Alin Nature Reserve, which was designated UNESCO World Heritage in 2001. The Bikin valley is covered with dense forest and constitutes an important habitat for the Amur tiger. During the late 1980s, Pavel Sulyandziga lived in the village of Krasny Yar, where he was successful in mobilizing the population against the administration's plans to grant timber harvesting licenses to a Soviet-Korean joint venture led by Hyundai. Since then, he has remained one of the most outspoken indigenous rights activists in the Russian Federation.

Since 1999 he has been co-editor of the magazine "The World of Indigenous Peoples - Living Arctic". In 2011, he was elected a member of the UN working group on human rights, transnational corporations and other types of business from the Eastern Europe region for three years.

In August 2012, with the participation of Sulyandziga and with the assistance of the Russian authorities, the evacuation of the seriously ill and isolated from the public world chess champion Boris Spassky from Paris to Moscow was planned and carried out.

In 2014, he was not released from Russia for the UN conference in the United States on indigenous peoples (according to Sulyandziga, a border guard tore a page from his passport and then declared that it was invalid).

In 2016, he was nominated by the Yabloko party as a candidate for the State Duma on the regional list from Primorsky Krai, as well as in a single-mandate constituency.

In 2017, he asked for political asylum in the United States.

References 

1962 births
Living people
People from Primorsky Krai
Indigenous rights activists
Russian political activists
Members of the Civic Chamber of the Russian Federation
Yabloko politicians
Tungusic peoples